Rusk is an unincorporated community in Ritchie County, West Virginia, United States.

Rusk was laid out circa 1880, and the name taken from the maiden name of a settler's wife.

References 

Unincorporated communities in West Virginia
Unincorporated communities in Ritchie County, West Virginia